Admiral (Ret.) Siwi Sukma Adji (born 14 May 1962) is a retired admiral of the Indonesian Navy who had served as its chief of staff (abbreviated KSAL or Kasal) since 23 May 2018 until 20 May 2020, replacing Ade Supandi who was retiring.

Before becoming chief of staff, he had served as the commander-general of the National Armed Forces Academy, Advisor for General Planning in TNI HQ, and commander of the western fleet.

Education
Born in Cimahi, West Java on 14 May 1962, he underwent normal civilian education and finishing his high school studies on 1981. He joined the Indonesian Naval Academy, graduating in 1985 as part of its 30th cohort. Later on, he also obtained a bachelor's degree in economics (2013) and a master's degree in human resources management (2016).

Career
After graduating from the academy, he began his service on the Van Speijk-class frigate KRI Oswald Siahaan (354). There, he was a gunnery officer. He then moved on, serving as a Chief of Operations on KRI Untung Surapati (372) and executive officer on KRI Teluk Sampit (515). He received the post of commander later on, starting out as commander of a Kondor-class minesweeper and later the Parchim-class corvette KRI Sultan Thaha Syaifuddin (376) and the Fatahillah-class frigate KRI Nala (363).

After the warship commands, he served as operations assistant of the Western Fleet command until March 2010, when he was a colonel. He also later held the positions of the commander of the Eastern Fleet Command's naval defense cluster (2011) and deputy planning assistant for the navy chief of staff. In August 2013, he held the rank of commodore and was appointed as the chief of staff for the Eastern Fleet Command. In July 2014, he was promoted to rear admiral. He became the commander of the Western Fleet Command on 19 July 2016, replacing Achmad Taufiqoerrachman who was in his naval academy class.

On 29 September 2017, he was appointed to become the commander-general of the armed forces academy. In December the same year, he received a promotion making him a vice admiral.

Chief of staff
In late January 2018, then-navy chief of staff Ade Supandi brought him forward alongside four others as possible candidates to replace him, as he was planning to retire by June. After armed forces commander Hadi Tjahjanto brought the five names forward to president Joko Widodo, the latter picked Siwi. Officially appointed through presidential decree 43/TNI/2018, he was sworn in on 23 May in Istana Negara. He was the 26th chief of staff in the body's history. Following his appointment, his rank was elevated to a four-star admiral.

References

1962 births
Chiefs of Staff of the Indonesian Navy
Living people
Indonesian admirals
People from Cimahi
Sundanese people